The цomen's omnium competition of the cycling events at the 2015 Pan American Games was held on July 18 and 19 at the Milton Velodrome in Milton, Ontario.

Schedule
All times are Eastern Daylight Time (UTC−4).

Results

Scratch

Individual Pursuit

Elimination

500 m Time Trial

Flying Lap

Points Race

Final standings

References

Track cycling at the 2015 Pan American Games
Women's omnium
Pan